Jorgy may refer to:

 Holger Jorgensen (1927-2020), Alaskan bush and commercial airline pilot - see Alaska Territorial Guard
 Noble Jorgensen (1925–1982), American basketball player
 Tom Jorgensen (c. 1935–2013), American college basketball coach and player sometimes known as Jorgy
 Andrew "Jorgy" Jorgenson, a main character in the 1991 film Other People's Money, played by Gregory Peck